The Academy of Saumur was a Huguenot university at Saumur in western France. It existed from 1593, when it was founded by Philippe de Mornay, until shortly after 1685, when Louis XIV decided on the revocation of the Edict of Nantes, ending the limited toleration of Protestantism in France.

Amyraldism

The Academy was the home of Amyraldism, an important strand of Protestant thought of the seventeenth century. Also called Saumurianism or hypothetical universalism, it was a moderate Calvinist movement, remaining within Calvinism.

The Helvetic Consensus and Westminster Confession were concerned to combat the tendency Amyraldism represented.

Faculty

Students

See also 
 List of early modern universities in Europe

References

Further reading
J.-P. Dray, The Protestant Academy of Saumur and its relations with the Oratorians of Les Ardilliers, History of European Ideas, 1988, p. 465-478.

Reformed church seminaries and theological colleges
Defunct universities and colleges in France
1593 establishments in France
1685 disestablishments in France